Amebic encephalitis may refer to:
 Primary amoebic meningoencephalitis
 Granulomatous amoebic encephalitis